Synemon selene, the pale sun-moth,  is a moth in the Castniidae family. It is found in Australia, including Victoria and South Australia.

The wingspan is about 35 mm for males and 47 mm for females. The forewing upperside is predominantly light brown or greyish brown with small black and white markings and pale fawn or greyish-fawn striations, which follow the veins. The hindwing upperside is yellowish orange with blackish spots and markings and a silvery-grey basal area. On their undersides, the forewings and hindwings are shades of pale whitish-orange with a few blackish spots and markings. A number of morphs occur, commonly named the pale morph, Terrick Terrick morph, Nhill morph, narrow-winged morph, dark morph and Two Wells morph.

Adults have been recorded from early February to early March.

The larvae probably feed on the roots of Austrodanthonia setacea.

References

Moths described in 1850
Castniidae
Taxa named by Johann Christoph Friedrich Klug